Yesenia Guadalupe Gómez Vasquez (born 21 January 1996) is a Mexican professional boxer who has held the WBC female light flyweight title since 2018. As of May 2020, she is ranked as the world's seventh best active female light flyweight by BoxRec.

Professional career
Gómez made her professional debut on 25 June 2011, losing by unanimous decision (UD) over four rounds against Dorely Valente at the Parque Andrés Quintana Roo in Cozumel, Mexico. Gómez bounced back from defeat with a four-round UD win against Rebeca Castro in February 2012, before losing her next fight to her debut opponent's twin sister, Arely Valente, in April.

She won her next three fights, two by stoppage, before facing Arely Valente in a rematch on 16 March 2013 at the Grand Oasis Arena in Cancún, Mexico. Gómez gained revenge by defeating Valente via UD over ten rounds to capture the WBC Youth female flyweight title, with the judges' scorecards reading 98–92, 98–93 and 97–93. After retaining her title with a first-round technical knockout (TKO) against Blanca Diaz the following May, she lost the title via majority decision (MD) in a third fight with Arely Valente on 17 August 2013 at the Plaza de Toros in Cancún. Two judges scored the bout 98–92 in favour of Valente, while the third scored it even at 96–96.

Two months later she faced Susana Cruz Perez for the WBC Youth female minimumweight title on 12 October in Calpulalpan, Mexico. Gómez suffered the fourth defeat of her career, losing via UD over ten rounds. Two judges scored the bout 98–92 and the third scored it 97–93.

After scoring three wins, one by stoppage, she captured her second professional title by defeating Guadalupe Ramirez for the WBC Youth female light flyweight title on 28 February 2015 at the Oasis Hotel Complex in Cancún. All three judges scored the bout 98–94.

After three more wins, two by stoppage, she faced future world champion Lourdes Juárez in September 2016. The bout was called off in the fourth round on the advice of the ringside doctor after Gómez suffered a cut from an  accidental clash of heads, resulting in a no contest (NC). Her next two fights were against Jacky Calvo in April and June 2017, with both resulting in a draw, followed by an MD loss to Guadalupe Bautista in September of the same year.

Her next fight came against reigning WBC female light flyweight champion Esmeralda Moreno 19 May 2018 at the Poliforum in Playa del Carmen, Mexico. Moreno retained her title through a majority draw, with two judges scoring the bout even at 95–95 while the third scored it 97–93 in favour of Gómez. She would get an immediate rematch with Moreno on 22 September 2018 at the Grand Oasis Arena. Gómez settled the score on their previous bout, defeating Moreno via MD to capture the WBC female light flyweight title. Two judges scored the bout in favour of Gómez with 97–93 and 96–94, while the third judge scored it even at 95–95.

Professional boxing record

References

Living people
1996 births
Mexican women boxers
Boxers from Quintana Roo
People from Cancún
Mini-flyweight boxers
Light-flyweight boxers
Flyweight boxers
World Boxing Council champions